C. Russell Feldmann (1898 - Greenwich, Connecticut, December 13, 1973) was an American businessman who in the 1930s built up a large conglomerate based on automobile radios. His first company, Winton Engine Company, was sold to Alfred P. Sloan and later became the diesel division of General Motors Corporation. His second company Automobile Radio Corporation, grew into National Union Electric Corporation which included non-automobile divisions including Eureka Williams Company, Emerson Quiet Kool, and Napco Plastics and Advanced Science.

References

20th-century American businesspeople
1898 births
1973 deaths